"Hope" is a song by American rapper Twista from the soundtrack of the 2005 movie Coach Carter. Featuring singer Faith Evans who performs the chorus, the song mainly focuses on Twista's view on the War on Terrorism. The version featuring Faith Evans can also be found on her album The First Lady. The song was released to US rhythmic and urban radio on November 22, 2004.

The original version of the song featured CeeLo Green (featured on the Kamikaze album and not including Faith Evans), was created in memory of the September 11 attacks. He also comments on the voice of rapper The D.O.C., which he lost from a car accident and mentions the deaths of rappers 2Pac and The Notorious B.I.G., singers Aaliyah and Lisa "Left Eye" Lopes and DJ Jam Master Jay.

Music video
The music video of the song, in a typical promotional music video fashion, features clips of the film Coach Carter. The video utilizes graphic design throughout, mostly along the main theme of tattoo artwork flowing and transforming into real objects, an example being the tattoo picture on a man's arm turning into a real picture.  It also incorporates scenes from the film and include several characters from the movie, including Samuel L. Jackson.

Track listings
UK CD single
 "Hope" (radio edit)
 "Hope" (clean)
 "Hope" (instrumental)
 "Hope" (video)

European CD single
 "Hope" (radio edit)
 "Hope" (instrumental)

Australian CD single
 "Hope" (radio edit)
 "Hope" (clean)
 "Hope" (acapella)

Charts

Release history

Cover versions
Chamillionaire did a remix to this song titled "I Wish". On May 18, 2014, over nine years after its original release, the song re-entered the UK Singles Chart at number 39 after it was covered by Bars and Melody on Britain's Got Talent the previous weekend. After the show, the duo released their version of "Hope" (retitled "Hopeful") as their debut single.

References

2000s ballads
2004 singles
2004 songs
Capitol Records singles
Contemporary R&B ballads
Faith Evans songs
Music videos directed by Chris Robinson (director)
Songs written by CeeLo Green
Songs written by Twista
Twista songs
Anti-war songs
Music about the September 11 attacks
Songs inspired by deaths